The 2018–19 Niagara Purple Eagles men's basketball team represented Niagara University in the 2018–19 NCAA Division I men's basketball season. They played their home games at the Gallagher Center in Lewiston, New York as members of the Metro Atlantic Athletic Conference, and were led by 6th-year head coach Chris Casey. They finished the 2018–19 season 13–19 overall, 6–12 in MAAC play to finish in a three-way tie for ninth place. As the 11th seed in the 2019 MAAC tournament, they were defeated by No. 6 seed Monmouth in the first round 72–76.

On March 11, 2019, head coach Chris Casey was fired. He finished at Niagara with a six-year record of 64–129. On March 28, 2019, Niagara hired Patrick Beilein as their new head coach.

Previous season
The Purple Eagles finished the 2017–18 season 19–14, 12–6 in MAAC play to finish in third place. They lost in the quarterfinals of the MAAC tournament to Fairfield. They were invited to the CollegeInsider.com Tournament, where they lost in the first round to Eastern Michigan.

Roster

Schedule and results

|-
!colspan=12 style=| Exhibition

|-
!colspan=12 style=| Non-Conference Regular season

|-
!colspan=9 style=| MAAC regular season

|-
!colspan=12 style=| MAAC tournament
|-

|-

Source

References

Niagara Purple Eagles men's basketball seasons
Niagara Purple Eagles
Niagara Purple Eagles men's basketball team
Niagara Purple Eagles men's basketball team